Carol Fox may refer to:

 Carol Fox (Chicago opera) (1926–1981), first impresario of the Chicago Lyric Opera
 Carol Fox (figure skater), American figure skater

See also
Fox (surname)